Crime in Florida refers to crime occurring within the U.S. State of Florida. With a population of 20,612,439 in 2016, Florida had 642,512 crimes reported including 1,111 murders, 88,700 violent, 553,812 property crimes, and 5,528 rapes.

Policing 

In 2008, Florida had 387 state and local law enforcement agencies. Those agencies employed a total of 81,312 staff. Of the total staff, 46,105 were sworn officers (defined as those with general arrest powers).

Police ratio 

In 2008, Florida had 250 police officers per 100,000 residents.

Capital punishment laws

Capital punishment is applied in Florida. In 1995, the legislature modified Chapter 921 to provide that felons should serve at least 85% of their sentence.

See also
 Incarceration in Florida
 List of Florida state prisons
 Law of Florida

References

Further reading